Blankenburg is a German surname. Notable people with the surname include:

Hermann Ludwig Blankenburg (1876–1956), German composer
Horst Blankenburg (born 1947), German footballer
Jo Blankenburg (born 1972), German composer
Lucretia Longshore Blankenburg (1845–1937), American suffragist, reformer
Nick Blankenburg (born 1998), American ice hockey player
Rita Blankenburg (born 1942), German speed skater
Rudolph Blankenburg (1843–1918), American businessman
Tom Blankenburg (1909–1979), American swimmer
Werner Blankenburg (1905–1957), German Nazi politician

German-language surnames

de:Blankenburg